Munidopsis tuberosa is a species of squat lobster, first isolated from deep waters off Taiwan. M. tuberosa is similar to M. granosicorium, but it differs by the configuration of its carapace and rostrum.

References

Further reading
Poore, Gary CB. "Three new American species of Munidopsis (Crustacea: Anomura: Munidopsidae)." Nauplius 22.1 (2014): 53-62.
Macpherson, Enrique. Species of the genus Munidopsis Whiteaves, 1784 from the Indian and Pacific Oceans and reestablishment of the genus Galacantha A. Milne-Edwards, 1880 (Crustacea, Decapoda, Galatheidae). Magnolia Press, 2007.
Baba, Keiji, and Gary CB Poore. "Munidopsis (Decapoda, Anomura) from south-eastern Australia." Crustaceana 75.3 (2002): 231-252.

External links

WORMS

Squat lobsters
Crustaceans described in 2008